Cottingham High School is a secondary school in Cottingham in the East Riding of Yorkshire, England. The school has specialist Arts College status, with facilities for media arts, music, drama and dance for performing arts. In July 2011 the school became an Academy.

History
Cottingham High School was originally named Cottingham Secondary School and was established in 1955 as a Secondary Modern school. The school site is on what was formerly Cottingham Grange, built in 1802. Part of the land which belonged to Cottingham Grange is now part of 'The Lawns', owned by the University of Hull for student halls of residence.

Because of the increased numbers of pupils attending the school, the original building was no longer large enough, and by September 1975 a new Science and Technical block was completed together with a second gymnasium and new sports hall. In 1978 a new Humanities and Modern Languages block and a Sixth Form block was completed. In 2000 a new Drama and Music block was built, and a Business Studies block was completed in 2003.

In September 2004 Cottingham High School gained Specialist in Media and Performing Arts status, which provided extra equipment and facilities, including a recording studio, film editing suite and ICT facilities.

In September 2009 the school became part of the Haltemprice Consortium along with Wolfreton School and Hessle High School.

In July 2011 the secondary school became an Academy.

In March 2012 Elizabeth Logan was suspended from her post as head of the school. She resigned from her post due to "personal and professional reasons" on 21 August 2012.

In May 2015 the school received a Grade 3 'Requires Improvement' rating from Ofsted.

Notable alumni
Stuart Pearson - professional footballer, England international and retired Football coach
Ben Pipes - London 2012 Team GB Men's Volleyball Team Captain.
Dave Stead - drummer with UK band the Beautiful South
Will Rhodes- England U19 Cricket Team Captain.

References

External links

Academies in the East Riding of Yorkshire
Cottingham, East Riding of Yorkshire
Secondary schools in the East Riding of Yorkshire
Specialist arts colleges in England